Andrew Chan Au-ming (born 6 January 1962) is the Archbishop of Hong Kong and Primate of Hong Kong Sheng Kung Hui (Anglican Church of Hong Kong) since January 2021 and the Bishop of its Western Kowloon diocese since March 2012. He was ordained as deacon in 1991 and priest in 1992. He was priest-in-charge of Holy Spirit Church, vicar of St. Luke's Church and the first Chinese dean of St. John's Cathedral.

Biography 
Chan trained as a music teacher in Grantham College of Education and studied in the University of Newcastle as an undergraduate. He did his theological training at Salisbury and Wells Theological College (1989-1991; now named as Sarum College), wherein he founded his ministry and forged a connection between Hong Kong and Salisbury. He furthered his studies in Heythrop College, University of London, in 2003 and obtained a Master of Arts degree in Pastoral Theology in 2004.

Previous church roles held by Chan include Bishop's Chaplain, Diocesan Secretary and Provincial Secretary. Soon after the inauguration of the Anglican Communion's province of Hong Kong and Macao the Sheng Kung Hui in 1998, he assisted the Archbishop Peter Kwong in establishing the administration system of the Provincial Office and building an effective network with diocesan and missionary offices to maintain mutual support amongst all areas of the Church in Hong Kong. He has been involved in maintaining the connection between the Province of Hong Kong and Macao, Sheng Kung Hui and office of the provinces of the Global Anglican Communion. He was appointed Dean of St John's Cathedral in May 2005 and was made Canon in November 2006.

Chan was elected bishop of the Diocese of West Kowloon in June 2011, consecrated on 25 March 2012 and enthroned on 26 March 2012. He was the Secretary General of the General Synod of the Sheng Kung Hui and took part in various diocesan and provincial bodies. He is Chairman of the Diocesan Worship Committee and SKH Primary School Council, Hon. Secretary of the Provincial Standing Committee and SKH Executive Committee, and member of the Provincial Finance Board, Provincial Constitution and Canon Commission, Liturgical Commission, Theological Education Commission, Diocesan Standing Committee and Diocesan Constitution and Canon Committee.

In October 2012, Chan was appointed Sarum Canon, an honorary position on Salisbury Cathedral's College of Canons. In March 2013, he became an Honorary Fellow of what is now the Education University of Hong Kong.

On 18 October 2020, the bishop was elected the next Archbishop of the Hong Kong Sheng Kung Hui, succeeding Paul Kwong. Chan was installed as the Primate on 3 January 2021.

References

 

1962 births
Living people
Alumni of Newcastle University
Alumni of Sarum College
Alumni of Heythrop College
21st-century Anglican bishops in China
Anglican archbishops of Hong Kong
Anglican bishops in Hong Kong
Deans of Hong Kong
Anglican bishops of Western Kowloon